Xibe may refer to:

Xibe people, a Tungusic ethnic group in western and northeastern China
Xibe language, a Tungusic language spoken by the Xibe people